Yamaha TZR is a motorcycle designation for:

Yamaha TZR125
Yamaha TZR250